Kimpale Mosengo (born 10 January 1963) is cyclist from the Democratic Republic of the Congo. He competed in two events at the 1988 Summer Olympics.

References

External links
 

1963 births
Living people
Democratic Republic of the Congo male cyclists
Olympic cyclists of the Democratic Republic of the Congo
Cyclists at the 1988 Summer Olympics
Place of birth missing (living people)
21st-century Democratic Republic of the Congo people